Aleksandar "Aca" Mišić (17 June 1891 – 17 December 1941) was a Serbian military commander holding the rank of major.

During World War II Mišić was complicit in handover of 365 captured Yugoslav Partisans to the Germans. Mišić was caught operation Mihailovic by the Germans and executed on 17th of December. In December 2016, Serbian pro-Chetnik publicist Miloslav Samardžić of Pogledi published an article stating that Mišić may have actually died in 1944 and not in 1941.

References

External sources
 
 
 

1891 births
1941 deaths
Military personnel from Belgrade
Serbian soldiers
Royal Serbian Army soldiers
Serbian military personnel of the Balkan Wars
Serbian military personnel of World War I
Serbian people of World War I
Chetnik personnel of World War II
Serbian people of World War II
Royal Yugoslav Army personnel of World War II
Serbian anti-communists
Serbian people of German descent
Executed military personnel
Executed Serbian people
Serbian people executed by Nazi Germany
People executed by Nazi Germany by firing squad